No. 80 Squadron RSAF is a squadron of the Royal Saudi Air Force that operates the Eurofighter Typhoon from King Fahad Air Base, Taif.

References

80